Bayenthaler SV was a German association football club from the Bayenthal district of Köln, North Rhine-Westphalia. After World War II the club joined SV Victoria Köln 1911 which in turn became part of the current-day club SC Fortuna Köln.

In 1943 SV advanced to the Gauliga Köln-Aachen (I) after finishing second in the local Bezirksliga (II) promotion round. They were immediately sent down after a seventh-place result. Following the war they played a single season (1946–47) in the Bezirksliga Rheinbezirk, Staffel 5 (I) before their merger with Victoria.

Stadium
In its earliest years SV played in the Goltsteinstraße and Bonner Straße before settling into Schönhauser Straße in 1924.

References

 Das deutsche Fußball-Archiv historical German domestic league tables 

Defunct football clubs in Germany
Defunct football clubs in North Rhine-Westphalia
Association football clubs established in 1920
Football clubs in Cologne
1920 establishments in Germany
1948 disestablishments in Germany
Association football clubs disestablished in 1948